Sene is an American online custom clothing brand headquartered in Los Angeles.

History

The company was initially started by Ray Li as a nights and weekend project while working full-time for brand consulting firm Interbrand. His cousin Mark Zheng joined in 2018 as a co-founder. Sene launched its first flagship FlexTech Suit product on Kickstarter in May 2019. That fall, Sene launched its custom jeans program for women and men.

The brand is headquartered in Los Angeles.

Collaborations
Sene worked with UFC champion Carlos Condit to design a custom denim collection.

References

2010s fashion
Online clothing retailers of the United States
Social enterprises
American companies established in 2016
Companies based in Los Angeles
Luxury brands